Robert Power (1833 – 4 November 1914) was an Australian cricketer. He played two first-class cricket matches for Victoria in 1858.

See also
 List of Victoria first-class cricketers

References

1833 births
1914 deaths
Australian cricketers
Victoria cricketers
Sportspeople from County Galway
Melbourne Cricket Club cricketers